Daniel James Metzger (born March 9, 1993) is an American professional soccer player who plays as a midfielder.

Career

Early career
Metzger was a member of the Players Development Academy for two years before joining the New York Red Bulls Academy in 2010. He also spent four years at the  University of Maryland between 2011 and 2014. In his four  years with the Terrapins he made 88 appearances and scored 8 goals and provided 4 assists. While at college, Metzger appeared for USL PDL club Austin Aztex during the 2013 season.

Professional
Metzger was selected with the 42nd overall pick in the 2015 MLS SuperDraft by D.C. United. He was released by the club during the preseason.

Metzger was signed by New York Red Bulls II for the 2015 season and made his debut for the club on April 4, 2015, in a 4–1 victory over Toronto FC II, the first victory in club history. On June 23, 2015, Metzger was named USL Player of the Week for his performance for NYRBII in a 2–0 victory over Louisville City FC. On April 22, 2016, Metzger scored his first goal as a professional, helping New York to a 1–0 victory over Wilmington Hammerheads FC. On August 2, 2016, Metzger recorded a goal and an assist for New York in a 5–0 rout over Harrisburg City Islanders. On October 23, 2016, Metzger helped the club to a 5–1 victory over Swope Park Rangers in the 2016 USL Cup Final.

On July 5, 2017, Metzger made his MLS debut as a late game substitute in a 3–2 victory over New England Revolution.

On February 13, 2018, Metzger joined the Penn FC of the United Soccer League.

Metzger played two seasons with USL Championship side Memphis 901 FC before leaving the club in April 2021.

International
Metzger has represented the United States at the U18, U20 and U23 level. He helped the United States to a third-place finish at the 2015 Toulon Tournament.

Career statistics

Honors

Club
New York Red Bulls II
USL Cup (1): 2016

References

External links
Red Bull Academy player profile
Maryland player profile 
 ussoccer.com profile

1993 births
Living people
American soccer players
Maryland Terrapins men's soccer players
Austin Aztex players
New York Red Bulls II players
New York Red Bulls players
Penn FC players
Association football midfielders
People from Holmdel Township, New Jersey
Soccer players from New Jersey
Sportspeople from Monmouth County, New Jersey
D.C. United draft picks
USL League Two players
USL Championship players
United States men's youth international soccer players
United States men's under-20 international soccer players
United States men's under-23 international soccer players
Memphis 901 FC players